Anna Ilina (born 1997) is a Ukrainian sports shooter. She is medalist of European Championships.

References

1997 births
Living people
Ukrainian female sport shooters
European Games competitors for Ukraine
Shooters at the 2019 European Games
21st-century Ukrainian women